Otero is a Spanish surname, and an occasional given name, derived from the Spanish word for height, and indicating a family history of having come from a geographically high place. The name also reflects association with places in Spain having this name.

People

Surname
Alejandro Otero (1921–1990), Venezuelan artist, writer and cultural promoter
 Blas de Otero (1916–1979), Spanish poet
Clementina Otero (1909–1996), Mexican actress
Dan Otero (born 1985), American baseball player
Jaime Otero Calderon (1921-1970), Bolivian congressman, mayor, secretary general, and journalist
Jorge Otero (born 1969), Spanish footballer
Jorge Otero Barreto (born 1937), the Puerto Rican Rambo
La Belle Otero (1868–1965), Spanish-born dancer, actress and courtesan
Luis Otero Mujica (1879–1940), Commander-in-Chief of the Chilean Army
Marcelo Otero (born 1971), Uruguayan footballer
Maria Otero (born 1950), Bolivian-born American under secretary of State
Mariano Sabino Otero (1844-1904), territorial delegate to U.S. Congress from New Mexico
Miguel Antonio Otero (born 1829) (1829–1882), territorial delegate to U.S. Congress from New Mexico
Miguel Antonio Otero (born 1859) (1859–1944), territorial governor of New Mexico and author
Miguel Otero Silva (1908–1985), Venezuelan writer, journalist, humorist and politician
Olimpio Otero Vergés (1845-1911), Puerto Rican merchant, attorney, composer, musical editor, and civic leader
Reggie Otero (1915-1988), Cuban baseball player
Renzo Otero  (born 1975), Bolivian American, Professional international Angler, True Hiker ,Amateur Nature Photographer

Given name
Otero Pedrayo (1888–1976), Galician geographer, writer and intellectual

References

Spanish-language surnames
Spanish toponymic surnames